Raymond Plant, Baron Plant of Highfield FKC (born 19 March 1945) is a British Labour peer and academic.

Lord Plant was educated at Havelock School in Grimsby, King's College London (BA Philosophy, 1966), and the University of Hull (PhD). He is currently Professor of Jurisprudence and Political Philosophy at King's College London and was previously Professor of Divinity at Gresham College, having previously served as Master of St Catherine's College, Oxford, from 1994 to 2000. He is an Honorary Fellow of Harris Manchester College, Oxford. Before moving to Oxford he was Professor of European Political Thought at the University of Southampton, and prior to that was a Senior Lecturer in philosophy at the University of Manchester.

He was created a life peer on 24 July 1992 taking the title Baron Plant of Highfield, of Weelsby in the County of Humberside.

Lord Plant was a member of the Nuffield Council on Bioethics from 2004 to 2007. In the Lords he is a member of the Joint Committee on Human Rights and has been a member of the Government and Law Sub Committee of the Committee on the European Communities. He is the author of several books on political philosophy, and is also a Lay Canon at Winchester Cathedral.

He is a member of the Athenaeum Club.

References

External links 
  'Contract, Obligation, Rights and Reciprocity in the New Modern Welfare State' Inaugural lecture of 'The Social Contract Revisited' programme by the Foundation for Law, Justice and Society, Oxford

1945 births
Living people
Alumni of King's College London
Alumni of the University of Hull
Academics of King's College London
Fellows of King's College London
Masters of St Catherine's College, Oxford
Academics of the University of Southampton
Academics of the University of Manchester
Fellows of Harris Manchester College, Oxford
Fellows of Corpus Christi College, Cambridge
Labour Party (UK) life peers
Life peers created by Elizabeth II
Professors of Gresham College